Reginald Stephen "Reggie, The Ruffian" Fleming (April 21, 1936 – July 11, 2009) was a professional hockey player in the National Hockey League with the Montreal Canadiens, Chicago Black Hawks, Boston Bruins, New York Rangers, Philadelphia Flyers and Buffalo Sabres. He also played for the Chicago Cougars of the World Hockey Association, as well as with a number of minor league teams in other professional leagues.  His professional career spanned over 20 years. He was known as an aggressive and combative player who could play both forward and defence, as well as kill penalties.

Before the NHL
After a junior career during which he spent two seasons with the Montreal Junior Canadiens of the Quebec Junior Hockey League (QJHL) and one year with St. Michael's of the Ontario Hockey Association (OHA), Fleming began his minor-pro career in the Habs' farm system with Shawinigan of the Quebec Senior Hockey League, followed by stops in Rochester of the American Hockey League  and Kingston of the Eastern Professional Hockey League. His rugged style of play earned him a three-game tryout with the Canadiens late in the 1959-60 NHL season. That summer Montreal and the Chicago Black Hawks made a nine-player trade which made Fleming a member of the Black Hawks.

Pro career
Fleming played four full seasons on a talented Chicago club alongside stars like Bobby Hull, Stan Mikita, Glenn Hall and Pierre Pilote. Fleming's aggressive style of play added an important physical presence to the Blackhawks and helped the team win the Stanley Cup for the  season, which was Fleming's first in Chicago. Fleming scored an important goal in the final game of the NHL finals against Detroit that year. He assisted on Bobby Hull's 50th goal the following season, helping Hull match the NHL record. A popular player with Chicago, he was known for his grit and team spirit. His involvement in a number of notorious incidents gave him a reputation around the league as a tough customer and an intense competitor.

Prior to the 1964–65 season, Chicago dealt Fleming to the Boston Bruins. Boston primarily used Fleming as a forward and he recorded personal highs of 18 goals and 23 assists for the 1964–65 season. Midway through the next season, he was traded to the New York Rangers. He would spend the remainder of that year and the following three with a rapidly improving Ranger club. Although a popular and consistent performer with the Rangers, he was sent to the Philadelphia Flyers for the 1969–70 season.  His experience and combativeness helped the small and unaggressive Flyers team. Left unprotected in the 1970 expansion draft, Fleming joined the Buffalo Sabres, where he recorded his career high in penalty minutes in 1970–71, his last NHL season.

After minor league stints with the Cincinnati Swords (AHL) and the Salt Lake Golden Eagles (WHL) in 1971–72, Fleming returned to Chicago, joining the Cougars of the newly formed WHA. After scoring 23 goals and playing his usual rugged style in 1972–73, injuries began to reduce his effectiveness the following season, his final season in the WHA. After playing for a few more seasons in the minors in the mid-western United States, Fleming retired in 1978.

Death
While recovering from a stroke and heart attack Fleming resided at the Claremont Rehab and Living Center for 5 years where he died.  During this time his son, Chris Fleming, filmed his situation and conversations in the hope of reaching his father's fans through YouTube and the internet. Touchingly, they documented Fleming's battle with ill-health and attempt to recollect his fondest memories. Fleming died at Northwest Community Hospital in Arlington Heights, Illinois on July 11, 2009. Six months after his death, neuropathologists at Boston University disclosed that he had chronic traumatic encephalopathy (C.T.E.). He was the first hockey player known to have been tested for the disease, which had been mainly associated with boxing and American football. He has two surviving children Chris Fleming and Kelly Fleming.

Career statistics

Regular season and playoffs

References

External links
 
 Klein, Jeff Z. "Reggie Fleming, Hockey Player Known for Physical Style, Dies at 73," The New York Times, Tuesday, July 14, 2009.
 Hackel, Stu. "The Morning Skate: Remembering Reggie Fleming," Slap Shot (The New York Times hockey blog), Monday, July 13, 2009.

1936 births
2009 deaths
Anglophone Quebec people
Boston Bruins players
Buffalo Sabres players
Canadian ice hockey defencemen
Chicago Blackhawks players
Chicago Cougars players
Cincinnati Swords players
Ice hockey players with chronic traumatic encephalopathy
Kingston Frontenacs (EPHL) players
Montreal Canadiens players
Montreal Junior Canadiens players
New York Rangers players
Philadelphia Flyers players
Rochester Americans players
Saginaw Gears players
Salt Lake Golden Eagles (WHL) players
Ice hockey people from Montreal
Stanley Cup champions
Toronto St. Michael's Majors players